The following is a list of current Mexican League stadiums. There are 17 stadiums in use. The oldest stadium is Estadio Revolución, home of the Algodoneros de Unión Laguna, which opened in 1932. The newest stadium is Estadio Alfredo Harp Helú, home of the Diablos Rojos del México, which opened in 2019. All but one stadium (Estadio Eduardo Vasconcelos) uses a natural grass playing surface. One stadium was built in the 1930s, two in the 1940s, one in the 1950s, two in the 1960s, six in the 1970s, one in the 1980s, one in the 1990s, one in the 2000s, and two in the 2010s. The highest seating capacity of all active stadiums is 27,000, at Estadio de Béisbol Monterrey where the Sultanes de Monterrey play. The lowest capacities are at the Piratas de Campeche's Estadio Nelson Barrera and the Tecolotes de los Dos Laredos' Parque la Junta and Uni-Trade Stadium, which all hold 6,000.

Current ballparks

{|class="wikitable sortable plainrowheaders"
!scope="col"|Stadium name
!scope="col"|Team
!scope="col"|City
!scope="col"|State
!scope="col"|Opened
!scope="col"|Capacity 
!scope="col"|Surface
!scope="col"|Ref
|-
!scope="row"|Estadio Centenario 27 de Febrero
|Olmecas de Tabasco
|Villahermosa
|Tabasco
|1964
|8,500
|Grass
|
|-
!scope="row"|Estadio de Béisbol Alberto Romo Chávez
|Rieleros de Aguascalientes
|Aguascalientes
|Aguascalientes
|1946
|9,000
|Grass
|
|-
!scope="row"|Estadio de Béisbol Francisco I. Madero
|Saraperos de Saltillo
|Saltillo
|Coahuila
|1964
|16,000
|Grass
|
|-
!scope="row"|Estadio de Béisbol Hermanos Serdán
|Pericos de Puebla
|Puebla
|Puebla
|1973
|12,100
|Grass
|
|-
!scope="row"|Estadio de Béisbol Monclova
|Acereros de Monclova
|Monclova
|Coahuila
|1975
|8,500
|Grass
|
|-
!scope="row"|Estadio de Béisbol Monterrey
|Sultanes de Monterrey
|Monterrey
|Nuevo León
|1990
|27,000
|Grass
|
|-
!scope="row"|Estadio Chevron
|Toros de Tijuana
|Tijuana
|Baja California
|1977
|16,811
|Grass
|
|-
!scope="row"|Estadio Domingo Santana
|Bravos de León
|León
|Guanajuato
|1973
|8,500
|Grass
|
|-
!scope="row"|Estadio Eduardo Vasconcelos
|Guerreros de Oaxaca
|Oaxaca
|Oaxaca
|1950
|7,200
|FieldTurf
|
|-
!scope="row"|Estadio Francisco Villa
|Generales de Durango
|Durango
|Durango
|1972
|9,000
|Grass
|
|-
!scope="row"|Estadio Nelson Barrera
|Piratas de Campeche
|Campeche
|Campeche
|2001
|6,000
|Grass
| 
|-
!scope="row"|Estadio Revolución
|Algodoneros de Unión Laguna
|Torreón
|Coahuila
|1932
|7,689
|Grass
|
|-
!scope="row"|Estadio Universitario Beto Ávila
|Rojos del Águila de Veracruz
|Veracruz
|Veracruz
|1992
|7,782
|Grass
|
|-
!scope="row"|Estadio Alfredo Harp Helú
|Diablos Rojos del México
|Mexico City
|Mexico City
|2019
|20,000
|Grass
|
|-
!scope="row"|Parque la Junta
|Tecolotes de los Dos Laredos
|Nuevo Laredo
|Tamaulipas
|1947
|6,000
|Grass
|
|-
!scope="row"|Parque Kukulcán Alamo
|Leones de Yucatán
|Mérida
|Yucatán
|1982
|16,000
|Grass
|
|-
!scope="row"|Uni-Trade Stadium
|Tecolotes de los Dos Laredos
|Laredo
|Texas
|2012
|6,000
|Grass
|
|-
!scope="row"|Beto Avila Stadium
|Tigres de Quintana Roo
|Cancun
|Quintana Roo
|1955
|9,500
|Grass
|
|}
 The Tecolotes de los Dos Laredos play half of their home games at Parque la Junta in Nuevo Laredo, Tamaulipas, Mexico, and the other half at Uni-Trade Stadium in Laredo, Texas, United States.

Map

See also
List of International League stadiums
List of Pacific Coast League stadiums
List of Triple-A baseball stadiums

References

External links
The Official Website of the Mexican League 

Mexican League stadiums
Mexican League stadiums